The 2011 European Fencing Championships was the 24th edition and was held in Sheffield, United Kingdom. The event took place from July 13–19, 2011.

Schedule

Medal summary

Men's events

Women's events

Medal table

Results overview

Men

Foil individual

Epée individual

Sabre individual

Foil team

Epée team

Sabre team

Women

Sabre individual

Foil individual

Epée individual

Sabre team

Foil team

Epée team

References

External links
Official site

European Fencing Championships
E
Fencing Championships
Fencing Championships
Sports competitions in Sheffield
International fencing competitions hosted by the United Kingdom
2010s in Sheffield
European Fencing Championships